Hartswater is an agricultural town on the N18 national route some 23 km south of Taung and 36 km north of Warrenton. The centre of the Vaalharts Irrigation Scheme, it became a municipality in April 1960. It takes its name from the Harts River which passes to the west of the town.

Background
The town was laid out in 1948. There is a monument built in the shape of a miniature church dedicated to the women of Vaalharts for their contribution towards building and developing the Vaalharts irrigation scheme located in the town of Hartswater. The town has its own wine cellar and also a newly built olive processing business.

Hartswater is centrally located to Jan Kempdorp, Pampierstad, Ganspan, Taung and Christiana.

References

Populated places established in 1948
Populated places in the Phokwane Local Municipality
1934 establishments in South Africa